Picton (Greenbush) Aerodrome  is located  east southeast of Picton, Ontario, Canada.

References

Registered aerodromes in Ontario